The A Word is a BBC television drama series, based on the Israeli series Yellow Peppers. The series follows a young boy and how his family cope with the revelation that he has autism spectrum disorder. Following filming in the Lake District from October 2015, a six-part series began airing on 22 March 2016. On 26 May 2016, the BBC announced that a second series of The A Word had been commissioned. It premiered in the UK on 7 November 2017. The third series began airing on 5 May 2020.

Synopsis
Five-year-old Joe Hughes displays clear signs of communication problems and consistently isolates himself by listening to pop music through large blue and black headphones. He has encyclopaedic knowledge of the songs he listens to and accurately sings along with the lyrics. His parents, Alison and Paul, seem oblivious to the disorder and wonder why Joe is ostracised by other children of the same age. However, it is later discovered by Joe's grandfather, Maurice, that Alison and Paul have been taking him to hospital for his communication problems. Other family members know there is a problem, however, their attempts to intervene are met with obstruction from Joe's parents. After originally believing Joe had hearing problems, their Ear, Nose and Throat consultant refers Joe to a specialist who diagnoses him as autistic.

The story then follows how the dysfunctional family, including Rebecca (who feels invisible), Eddie and Nicola (who are coping with their own relationship problems) and tactless grandad Maurice cope with Joe's situation and their own apparent social disorders.

Cast

Production
Bowker drew on his own experiences and observations as a teacher and with his family to write The A Word. Autism advocate Deborah Brownson served as an advisor on the production.

Filming took place from October 2015 at locations in the Lake District, including Keswick, Broughton-in-Furness, Coniston, Thirlmere Reservoir, and at The Space Project studios in Manchester.

On 24 May 2019, it was announced by the BBC, and then subsequently via press and social media publications, that a third series was in production. Returning cast members included Christopher Eccleston, Morven Christie, Lee Ingleby, Max Vento, Molly Wright, Greg McHugh, Pooky Quesnel, Matt Greenwood and Leon Harrop. Joining the cast as newcomers were Julie Hesmondhalgh, Sarah Gordy and David Gyasi.

Episodes

Series overview
</onlyinclude>

Series 1 (2016)

Series 2 (2017)

Series 3 (2020)

Broadcast and reception
BBC One began airing the first six-part series in a Tuesday 9pm slot, replacing Happy Valley, on 22 March 2016. SundanceTV acquired rights for broadcasting the show in America, and it premiered there on 13 July 2016. A second series began in the UK on 7 November 2017 remaining in its Tuesday 9pm slot. A third series was filmed in May 2019 and the entire series was released on BBC iPlayer on 5 May 2020. On the same day it also began broadcasting in its usual weekly slot on BBC One. BBC First airs the series in Australia. Disney+ picked up the programme for all three series across all of Europe, except the UK.

Overnight figures revealed the first episode was watched by 4.7 million viewers and had a 23% share of the audience. BARB later reported a consolidated figure of 5.91 million. Reaction to the first episode was mostly positive among viewers. Many people have praised the show on social media, partly for the quality of the acting but also for the way it dealt with the subject of autism.

Home media
Series 1 was released on DVD in September 2016, and series 2 in December 2017. The third series was released on DVD in July 2020.

Spin-off series
In August 2020 it was announced that a spin-off series Ralph & Katie, following the married life of the protagonists, had been commissioned by the BBC. The six-part series, which included a writing team made up predominantly of people with disabilities, was broadcast in October and November 2022, with all episodes available as a boxset on BBC iPlayer. The series will also be available on Disney+ in some regions.

References

External links
 
 
 

2016 British television series debuts
2020 British television series endings
2010s British drama television series
2020s British drama television series
Autism in television
Autism in the United Kingdom
BBC high definition shows
BBC television dramas
British television series based on non-British television series
Down syndrome in television
English-language television shows
International television series based on Israeli television series
Television series about dysfunctional families
Television shows set in the Lake District